Latest Version of the Truth is the fourth full-length album by Swedish heavy metal band Mustasch. It was released in 2007.

Track listing 
"In the Night" - 4:22
"Double Nature" - 4:45
"Falling Down" - 3:56
"The Heckler" - 3:31
"I Wanna Be Loved" - 5:44
"Scyphozoa" - 2:11
"Spreading the Worst" - 3:17
"Bring Me Everyone" - 3:57
"Forever Begins Today" - 4:18
"I Am Not Aggressive" - 3:26
"The End" - 9:26
"Once a Liar" (Japanese edition bonus track)

Charts

Weekly charts

Year-end charts

References 

2003 albums
Mustasch albums